60S ribosomal export protein NMD3 is a protein that in humans is encoded by the NMD3 gene.

Interactions 

NMD3 has been shown to interact with XPO1.

References

Further reading